Lambada is a Brazil-origin dance that became popular worldwide during the 1980s and early 1990s.

Lambada may also refer to:

 "Lambada" (song), a 1989 song recorded by the pop group Kaoma
 Lambada (film), a 1990 American film
 Distar UFM-13 Lambada, a motorglider produced in the Czech Republic

See also
Lambadi, people of India
Lambda (disambiguation)